Kajlagarh is a village and a gram panchayat in Bhagabanpur I CD block in Egra subdivision of Purba Medinipur district in the state of West Bengal, India.

Geography

Location

Urbanisation
96.96% of the population of Egra subdivision live in the rural areas. Only 3.04% of the population live in the urban areas, and that is the lowest proportion of urban population amongst the four subdivisions in Purba Medinipur district.

Civic administration

CD block HQ
The headquarters of Bhagabanpur I CD block are located at Kajlagarh.

Transport
Kajlagarh is on Egra-Bajkul Road.

The nearest railway station, Deshapran railway station, is on the Tamluk-Digha line, constructed in 2003–04.

Education
Bajkul Milani Mahavidyalaya was established at Tethi Bari mouza, PO Kismat Bajkul, in 1964. It is affiliated to Vidyasagar University.

Culture
David J. McCutchion mentions the Gopala temple as an 18th-century West Bengal Navaratna, measuring 35' 3" square, having slight terracotta.

Kajlagarh picture gallery

Healthcare
There is a primary health centre at Kajlagarh (with 6 beds).

References

External links

Villages in Purba Medinipur district